"Restless and Wild" is a song by German heavy metal band Accept from their album Restless and Wild, released in 1982. Written and composed by Wolf Hoffmann, Peter Baltes, Herman Frank, Stefan Kaufmann, Udo Dirkschneider and Robert A. Smith-Diesel, it was also released as a single with "Don't Go Stealing My Soul Away" as the B-side. Another song from the Restless and Wild album, "Fast as a Shark", was also released as a single in 1982. "Restless and Wild" was later coupled with "Fast as a Shark" for a UK 12-inch single in 1983.

"Restless and Wild" appears on eight Accept compilation albums: Restless: The Best (1982), Best of Accept (1983), Hungry Years (1985), A Compilation of the Best of Balls to the Wall/Restless and Wild (1986), The Collection (1991), Steel Glove (1995), Sharkbite – Best Of (2005) and The Accept Collection (2010).

Track listing

1982 7-inch single

1983 12-inch single

Personnel
Udo Dirkschneider – vocals
Wolf Hoffmann – guitar
Herman Frank – guitar
Peter Baltes – bass guitar
Stefan Kaufmann – drums

References

Accept (band) songs
1982 songs
1982 singles